Mạc Đĩnh Chi (1272–1346) was a renowned Vietnamese Confucian scholar who was the highest-scoring graduate in the palace examinations at the age of only twenty-four. He served three Trần dynasty emperors—first Trần Anh Tông until 1314, then his son Trần Minh Tông from 1314 to 1319, and finally the grandson Trần Hiến Tông after 1329. Mạc Đĩnh Chi was sent twice as envoy to the Chinese court. Among the Trân dynasty court scholars he was almost unique in that his academic degree was recognized by the Chinese. He himself is also the ancestor of the emperors of the Mạc dynasty.

The Mac Dinh Chi Cemetery is named in his honour.

References

Vietnamese Confucianists
Trần dynasty officials
1350 deaths
1280 births